Bid Duri (also Romanized as Bīd Dūrī; also known as Beduri, Bīdūrī, and Kahn-e Bīdūrī) is a village in Gevar Rural District, Sarduiyeh District, Jiroft County, Kerman Province, Iran. At the 2006 census, its population was 40, in 8 families.

References 

Populated places in Jiroft County